Violetta Oblinger-Peters (born 14 October 1977 in Schwerte, North Rhine-Westphalia) is a German-born, Austrian slalom canoeist who has competed at the international level since 1995. Competing in three Summer Olympics, she won a bronze medal in the K1 event in Beijing in 2008.

Oblinger-Peters also won two bronze medals at the ICF Canoe Slalom World Championships (K1: 2010, K1 team: 2005). She won three medals at the European Championships (1 gold, 1 silver and 1 bronze).

Her husband, Helmut, competed at the Olympics, as did her father Wolfgang and uncle Ulrich.

In April 2009 she and her husband became parents of a boy.

World Cup individual podiums

1 Pan American Championship counting for World Cup points

References

2010 ICF Canoe Slalom World Championships 11 September 2010 K1 women's final results. - accessed 11 September 2010.

1977 births
Living people
People from Schwerte
Sportspeople from Arnsberg (region)
Austrian female canoeists
West German female canoeists
Canoeists at the 2000 Summer Olympics
Canoeists at the 2004 Summer Olympics
Canoeists at the 2008 Summer Olympics
Olympic canoeists of Austria
Olympic bronze medalists for Austria
Olympic medalists in canoeing
Medalists at the 2008 Summer Olympics
Medalists at the ICF Canoe Slalom World Championships